The Australia women's national under-18 ice hockey team is the women's national under-18 ice hockey team of Australia. The team is controlled by Ice Hockey Australia, a member of the International Ice Hockey Federation.

History
The Australia women's national under-18 ice hockey team was formed in 2012 in order to qualify and compete in the IIHF World Women's U18 Championships. The team held its first training camp in September 2012 in Adelaide, South Australia and in January 2013 held another training camp in Brisbane, Queensland. Tamra Jones was named as the team's first head coach with Jo Frankenberger as her assistant. Following the two camps, 14 players and one goalie were included on the team roster. The team played their first game on 6 December 2013 against the New Zealand women's national under-18 ice hockey team in Dunedin, New Zealand, tying 2-2. It was part of a four-game series being held in Dunedin between the two teams. Australia went on to lose the remaining three games of the series. In December 2014 Australia hosted the New Zealand women's national under-18 ice hockey team for a five-game series at the Medibank Icehouse in Melbourne. The team won the series three games to two and were awarded the 2014 Trans-Tasman Cup. They also recorded their largest international win in game four, defeating New Zealand 8–1. In August 2015 Australia competed in two games against the Denmark women's national under-18 ice hockey team as part of their 2015 Denmark Tour which also included a training camp that had begun on 25 July. Australia lost the opening game 2–12 with Natalie Ayris and Madison Poole scoring the team's two goals. In the second game of the tour Australia lost 1–9 with Emily Davis-Tope scoring the only goal on the third period buzzer.

In January 2016 the team debuted at the IIHF World Women's U18 Championships where they played in the 2016 Division I Qualification tournament in Spittal an der Drau and Radenthein, Austria. Australia was placed in Group B with Great Britain, Italy and Poland. The team finished last in Group B's preliminary round after losing all three of their games and advanced to the seventh place classification game against Romania, who had finished last in Group A. Australia defeated Romania following a shootout and finished the tournament in seventh place. Kate Tihema was selected as best Australian player of the tournament. The team started 2017 with a training camp in January in Copenhagen, Denmark ahead of the 2017 IIHF Ice Hockey U18 Women's World Championship Division I Group B Qualification tournament. During the training camp Australia took on the Danish women's under-18 team in two exhibition games where they lost 3–5 and 0–3. The team then traveled to San Sebastián, Spain for the start of their World Championship tournament. At the tournament Australia took on hosts Spain, Mexico and Romania in a single round robin schedule. Australia won the tournament after winning all three of their games which including their largest international win on record, defeating Romania 10–0. As a result of the tournament win Australia earned promotion to Division I Group B for the 2018 World Championships. Goaltender Keesha Atkins was selected as best Australian player of the tournament.

In January 2018 Australia arrived in Katowice, Poland for the 2018 IIHF Ice Hockey U18 Women's World Championship Division I Group B tournament. Prior to the start of the tournament the team played Denmark in an exhibition game which they lost 0–10. Australia opened the Division I Group B tournament with a 1–6 loss to France. They went on to lose their other four games of the tournament against China, Denmark, Great Britain and Poland, and finished the tournament in last place. As a result, the team was relegated back to Division I Group B Qualification for 2019. Captain Emily Davis-Tope was named best Australian player of the tournament.

International competitions
2016 IIHF World Women's U18 Championships. Finish: 7th in Division I Qualification (21st overall)
2017 IIHF World Women's U18 Championships. Finish: 1st in Division I Group B Qualification (21st overall)
2018 IIHF World Women's U18 Championships. Finish: 6th in Division I Group B (20th overall)
2019 IIHF World Women's U18 Championships. Finish: 4th in Division I Group B Qualification (24th overall)
2020 IIHF World Women's U18 Championships. Finish: 3rd in Division II A (23rd overall)

Players and personnel

Current roster
For the 2022 IIHF World Women's U18 Championship Division II

Current team staff
For the 2022 IIHF World Women's U18 Championship Division II
Head coach: Tamra Jones
Assistant coach: Remi Harvey
Assistant coach: Gabriel Robledo
General Manager: Candice Mitchell
Team Leader: Mark Stephenson
Team Medical Officer: James Brodie

Game record

References

External links
 Ice Hockey Australia

 
Nat
Ice hockey
Women's national under-18 ice hockey teams